Ofer Sela (born 22 July 1972) is a former professional tennis player from Israel.

Biography
Sela comes from Haifa and is the son of Romanian-Jewish immigrants. The eldest of four siblings, he is a brother of Dudi Sela, who he later helped coach. As a teenager he played basketball but instead went for a career in tennis and in 1990 began playing on the international circuit.

Tennis career
A right-handed player, Sela qualified for the singles main draw of the Tel Aviv Open on three occasions, with his best performance coming in 1993, when he beat Rodolphe Gilbert and took fourth-seed Javier Sanchez to three sets in a second-round loss.

His only other ATP Tour appearance came at the 1995 Hong Kong Open, also as a qualifier.

References

External links
 
 

1972 births
Living people
Israeli male tennis players
Sportspeople from Haifa
Israeli people of Romanian-Jewish descent
Jewish tennis players
Israeli Jews